Peter Kravitz is a figure in the Scottish literary scene. He was born in London, England, but has lived most of his life in Edinburgh. He is Jewish. He is edited Contemporary Scottish Fiction, reprinted by Picador and Faber, and brought new Scottish writers to a wider audience.

From 1980 to 1990 during Kravitz’s term as editor, Polygon, the former University of Edinburgh student imprint, came to lead the field in publishing new Scottish fiction. His editorship of the Edinburgh Review from 1984 to 1990 supplied fresh talent. He was influential in developing discussion between people in literature, politics and the visual arts, in Scotland and beyond.

While at Polygon, he tried to publish James Kelman's second novel, and requested a grant from the Scottish Arts Council. They refused on the basis of a complaint from Alick Buchanan-Smith, a Conservative MP, who complained about the "foul language" in Kelman's first novel. In the late 1990s, he worked for Napier University, and he is now a psychotherapist and counsellor in Edinburgh. He still writes occasionally on Scottish literature.

External links
 Galloway archive: Guest essays

Scottish Jews
Academics of Edinburgh Napier University
Living people
Year of birth missing (living people)
Scottish people of English descent
Writers from Edinburgh
Scottish literary critics
Scottish magazine editors
English male writers

British Jewish writers